Glenn Astwood (born 16 November 1954) is a Bermudian sailor. He competed in the Tornado event at the 1988 Summer Olympics.

References

External links
 

1954 births
Living people
Bermudian male sailors (sport)
Olympic sailors of Bermuda
Sailors at the 1988 Summer Olympics – Tornado
Place of birth missing (living people)